Victoria Jepson (born 23 February 1987) is an English professional football manager. She is interim manager of Tottenham Hotspur F.C. Women of the Women's Super League. She previously managed Liverpool in both the WSL and Women's Championship.

Background 
Born in Macclesfield, Jepson attended Macclesfield College and coached at Macclesfield Town. She started working at Liverpool in 2009 holding various roles including coaching across the entire elite girls pathway from u11s up to the u21s squad whilst holding coach education courses with the Premier League abroad in Indonesia, China, Hong Kong and Qatar . In addition she has worked for The FA at their girls' excellence camps which help to develop the country's best younger players. In 2014, Jepson was nominated for the FA Female Development Coach of the Year, and won the award the following year after transitioning several youth players into the senior Liverpool FC Women's Squad.

Career history

Liverpool 
Jepson was appointed assistant manager to Neil Redfearn at Liverpool in June 2018. After just one game, Redfearn departed the club, leaving Jepson as part of the interim managerial team headed by Chris Kirkland. On 26 October 2018, Jepson was appointed as first team manager on a permanent basis. Jepson's first game in charge was a 1–0 victory against Hope Powell's Brighton Hove Albion. Liverpool finished the season 8th out of 12 teams in the league.

The following season, Liverpool were relegated from the Women's Super League on sporting merit after The FA Board's decision to award places on a points-per-game basis following the curtailment of the season eight games early due to the COVID-19 pandemic. Liverpool had won one game, picking up six points from 14 games during the 2019–20 FA WSL.

She continued with the team following relegation until, on 12 January 2021, Liverpool announced that Jepson had left the club by mutual consent with the team sat in third place in the Championship.

Tottenham Hotspur 
Jepson joined Tottenham Hotspur as assistant manager to Rehanne Skinner in July 2021. In March 2023, she was named interim manager following the firing of Skinner.

Managerial statistics
All competitive games (league and domestic cups) are included.

References

1987 births
Living people
Macclesfield Town F.C. non-playing staff
Women's Super League managers
English women's football managers
Liverpool L.F.C. managers
Sportspeople from Macclesfield
Liverpool F.C. non-playing staff